John Beatty (December 16, 1828December 21, 1914) was an American banker and statesman from Sandusky, Ohio. He served as a brigadier general in the Union Army during the American Civil War.

Biography
Beatty was born near Sandusky, Ohio. He entered the banking business in Morrow County. Presidential elector for Lincoln/Hamlin in 1860 and in 1884.
 
When the Civil War started Beatty volunteered as a private in the 3rd Ohio Infantry, serving in western Virginia. By 1863, he was commissioned as a brigadier general following his distinguished service in the Battle of Perryville, the Battle of Stones River, and the Tullahoma Campaign. He took command of a brigade of infantry and led it through the rest of the war. Beatty participated in the Tullahoma Campaign, the Battle of Chickamauga, and the successful Union attack on Missionary Ridge during the Chattanooga Campaign. He resigned his commission in January 1864 and re-entered the banking business.

Following the war, he represented Ohio in the U.S. Congress from 1868 to 1873.

He served as a presidential elector in 1884 for the Blaine/Logan ticket.

A 1909 biographer wrote that Beatty "is the sole survivor of the electoral college of Ohio, which cast its vote for Abraham Lincoln in 1860, and as far as known, the only surviving elector who cast a vote for President Lincoln when he was chosen to his first term almost a half century ago."

Beatty was buried in Oakland Cemetery in Sandusky.

Autobiography
Beatty wrote The citizen-soldier, or, Memoirs of a volunteer, Cincinnati : Wilstach, Baldwin, 1879.  The book has been reprinted more than once.

See also

List of American Civil War generals (Union)

Notes 

Attribution

References

 Retrieved on 2008-02-12

External links
 
 The Citizen-Soldier by John Beatty at Project Gutenberg
 

1828 births
1914 deaths
People of Ohio in the American Civil War
Union Army generals
Politicians from Sandusky, Ohio
1860 United States presidential electors
19th-century American politicians
Republican Party members of the United States House of Representatives from Ohio
1884 United States presidential electors